The 2012–13 SSV Jahn Regensburg season was the 106th season in the club's football history. In 2012–13 the club played in the 2. Bundesliga, the second tier of German football. It was the club's first season back in this league, having won promotion from the 3. Liga in 2011–12 after a play-off victory over Karlsruher SC.

The club also took part in the 2012–13 edition of the DFB-Pokal, the German Cup, but was knocked out by Bundesliga side FC Bayern Munich in the first round.

Review and events
After a string of losses, manager Oscar Corrochano was suspended on 4 November 2012 and sporting director Franz Gerber took over until the end of 2012. On 2 January 2013, Franciszek Smuda was announced as new manager. His contract ran until the end of the 2012–13 and would have been automatically extended for another season if Regensburg avoided relegation. But Regensburg's relegation was clear on matchday 31 and Smuda said that he would not coach in the 3. Liga.

Matches

Legend

Friendly matches

2. Bundesliga

DFB-Pokal

Squad

Squad and statistics

Squad, matches played and goals scored

Minutes played

Starting 11

Bookings

Transfers

In

Out

Sources

External links
 2012–13 SSV Jahn Regensburg season at Weltfussball.de 
 2012–13 SSV Jahn Regensburg season at kicker.de 
 2012–13 SSV Jahn Regensburg season at Fussballdaten.de 

Jahn Regensburg
SSV Jahn Regensburg seasons